The Kia Cadenza (also known in South Korea as Kia K7) is a full-size/executive sedan manufactured by Kia. It was launched in 2010 to replace the Kia Opirus/Amanti.

As of January 2014, it was sold in South Korea, United States, Canada, China, Colombia, Brazil, Chile, and the Middle East.

First generation (VG; 2009)

The Cadenza uses the new front-wheel-drive Type-N platform with MacPherson front suspension and a multilink rear suspension. The Cadenza was offered with three gasoline engines ranging from 165 horsepower to 290 horsepower for the 3.5-liter Lambda. A new 2.4-liter Theta II with gasoline direct injection (GDI) that produced 201 horsepower was also available. A hybrid K7 700h was available in Korea, featuring a 159 hp four cylinder engine and a 35 kW electric motor.

The Kia Cadenza was designed by Kia design chief Peter Schreyer who was chief designer at Audi and uses Kia's corporate Tiger Nose grille.

In January 2013, Kia announced that the Cadenza will be available in the United States. It is Kia's version of the Hyundai Azera. Standard features will include leather seats, Bluetooth, a navigation system, Kia UVO, alloy wheels, and other luxury car features. This was one of five Korean luxury sedans sold in the United States at the time, the other four cars being the Hyundai Azera, Hyundai Genesis, Kia K900 and Hyundai Equus.

The car features Nappa leather seats, a feature commonly found on more expensive vehicles such as those from BMW and Mercedes-Benz. The Nappa leather is available in three colors: black, beige, or white (the white interior requires all three packages available on the Cadenza: the Luxury, Technology, and White Interior Packages). The driver's seat is both heated and ventilated, and the passenger's seat is heated. The rear seats can also be heated. A dual sunroof is available. The car features the 3.3L, 294 horsepower V6, the most powerful engine available for the Cadenza. The engine is used in the Cadenza's platform mate, the Hyundai Azera, and is a Hyundai-built engine from the Lambda engine family.

Powertrain

Gallery

Second generation (YG; 2016)

Released in Fall 2016, the second generation Kia Cadenza was redesigned by Peter Schreyer. The car is offered with a revised 3.3-liter V6 that generates . Aside from the 6-speed automatic, the Cadenza is offered with a new in-house developed 8-speed automatic with a drive mode select system.

2019 update
The Cadenza received a facelift in June 2019. Mechanical changes include a new 2.5L SmartStream G engine replacing the 2.4L Theta II GDI engine while the 3.5L Lambda II MPI engine replaces the 3.3L Lambda II GDI engine in some regions. For styling, the update includes a new grille and hood, new front and rear bumpers, new wheel design and a new 12.3 inch infotainment touchscreen.

The Cadenza was discontinued in Canada after the 2019 model year, and in the US after the 2020 model year. Kia cited the market transition from large cars to crossovers and SUVs. Production ended in January 2021 to make way for a new model, the Kia K8.

Powertrain

Safety
The Cadenza received a "Top Safety Pick+" rating from the Insurance Institute for Highway Safety (IIHS).

Gallery

Sales

References

External links

 (English)
 (USA)

Cadenza
Cars introduced in 2010
2020s cars
Full-size vehicles
Sedans
Front-wheel-drive vehicles
Hybrid vehicles